Hillcrest Heights Institute (HHI) is a private school located in the barangay of  San Francisco, Magalang, Pampanga.
The school was established in June 2005 by the Tolentino family in response to the increasing population and modernization of Magalang and its surrounding areas.

References

External links
 Wikimapia location

Schools in Pampanga